The 1999 World Table Tennis Championships mixed doubles was the 45th edition of the mixed doubles championship.

Ma Lin and Zhang Yingying defeated Feng Zhe and Sun Jin in the final by three sets to one.

Results

See also
List of World Table Tennis Championships medalists

References

-